Harry Thomson may refer to:

 Harry Thomson (footballer) (1940–2013), Scottish footballer
 Harry Thomson (politician) (1934–2019), Malawian businessman and politician

See also
 Henry Thomson (disambiguation)
 Harry Thompson (disambiguation)